SMA Negeri 1 Malang, which stands for , is a state high school that is located at Tugu Utara No. 1, Malang, Jawa Timur, Indonesia. Together with SMA Negeri 4 and SMA Negeri 3, they are usually called SMA Tugu, since they are located at Tugu, one of the most beautiful and famous landscapes in Malang.

The history of the school began with the Dutch colonization many years ago.

External links
  The official site of SMA Negeri 1 Malang
  The official site of alumni of SMA Negeri 1 Malang
  Mailing list for the alumni of SMA Negeri 1 Malang
  Alumni Group of SMA Negeri 1 Malang on Facebook
  Fan page  of alumni SMA Negeri 1 Malang on Facebook
 Location of SMA Negeri 1 Malang on Wikimapia

References

Schools in Indonesia
Malang
Schools in East Java